99 Ways to Die may refer to:
99 Ways to Die (album), a 1995 album by Master P
"99 Ways to Die", a song by Megadeth from Hidden Treasures (EP)